Tufan Erhürman (born 1970) is a Turkish Cypriot academic, lawyer, diplomat and a former Prime Minister of Northern Cyprus. A scholar in public law by profession, he served in the negotiations to solve the Cyprus dispute between 2008 and 2010. He previously worked for the Ministry of Justice of Turkey between 1999 and 2004 and worked for the establishment of the position of ombudsman in Turkey. He is the current leader of Republican Turkish Party. He held the office of Prime Minister beginning January 2018 as the leader of a four-party coalition. The coalition government resigned on 9 May 2019, with Erhürman continuing as Prime Minister until the office was taken over by Ersin Tatar on 22 May 2019.

Education
Erhürman finished his secondary education in Türk Maarif Koleji. He was then enrolled to study law at Ankara University in 1988. He received his master's degree and doctorate from Ankara University as well. His 2001 PhD thesis was on the "Non-Juridical Inspection of the Authority and the Ombdusman".

Academic career
Erhürman lectured on public law at the Ankara University, Middle East Technical University and Hacettepe University between 1995 and 2001. He then lectured at the Eastern Mediterranean University from 2001 to 2006, and from 2008 to 2013. Erhürman also lectured at the Near East University between the years of 2006 and 2008.

Political career 
Erhürman became involved in the negotiations to solve the Cyprus dispute under President Mehmet Ali Talat between 2008 and 2010.

He ran for a Nicosia seat at the Assembly of the Republic in the 2013 elections and became a Member of Parliament as a candidate of the Republican Turkish Party-United Forces. He worked extensively to change the constitution where 23 changes were agreed by all 4 parties which were being represented in the parliament at that time. However, 62.3% of the voters rejected the new constitution in the 2014 referendum. He became the Secretary General of the Republican Turkish Party-United Forces.

On 13 November 2016, Erhürman became the leader of the Republican Turkish Party and thus of the main opposition.

He was reelected as a Member of the Parliament during the 2018 snap elections, however he could not prevent his party from losing 9 seats. On 19 January 2018, negotiations started to form a coalition between 4 parties, the Republican Turkish Party, the People's Party, the Democratic Party and the Communal Democracy Party, ultimately succeeding in the formation of the Erhürman cabinet.

Electoral history

2020 Northern Cypriot presidential election

References

1970 births
Living people
21st-century prime ministers of Northern Cyprus
Leaders of political parties in Northern Cyprus
Türk Maarif Koleji alumni
Government ministers of Northern Cyprus
Members of the Assembly of the Republic (Northern Cyprus)
Prime Ministers of Northern Cyprus
Republican Turkish Party politicians
People from North Nicosia
Date of birth missing (living people)
Turkish Cypriot expatriates in Turkey
Ankara University alumni
Academic staff of Middle East Technical University
Academic staff of Near East University
Academic staff of Eastern Mediterranean University
Academic staff of Hacettepe University
Turkish Cypriot academics